Mirosternus affinis is a species of beetle in the family Ptinidae.

Subspecies
These two subspecies belong to the species Mirosternus affinis:
 Mirosternus affinis affinis Perkins, 1910 i c g
 Mirosternus affinis suturalis Perkins, 1910 i c g
Data sources: i = ITIS, c = Catalogue of Life, g = GBIF, b = Bugguide.net

References

Further reading

 
 
 
 

Ptinidae
Beetles described in 1910